In geometry, a uniform 4-polytope (or uniform polychoron) is a 4-dimensional polytope which is vertex-transitive and whose cells are uniform polyhedra, and faces are regular polygons.

There are 47 non-prismatic convex uniform 4-polytopes. There are two infinite sets of convex prismatic forms, along with 17 cases arising as prisms of the convex uniform polyhedra. There are also an unknown number of non-convex star forms.

History of discovery 
 Convex Regular polytopes:
 1852: Ludwig Schläfli proved in his manuscript Theorie der vielfachen Kontinuität that there are exactly 6 regular polytopes in 4 dimensions and only 3 in 5 or more dimensions.
 Regular star 4-polytopes (star polyhedron cells and/or vertex figures)
 1852: Ludwig Schläfli also found 4 of the 10 regular star 4-polytopes, discounting 6 with cells or vertex figures {5/2,5} and {5,5/2}.
 1883: Edmund Hess completed the list of 10 of the nonconvex regular 4-polytopes, in his book (in German) Einleitung in die Lehre von der Kugelteilung mit besonderer Berücksichtigung ihrer Anwendung auf die Theorie der Gleichflächigen und der gleicheckigen Polyeder .
 Convex semiregular polytopes: (Various definitions before Coxeter's uniform category)
 1900: Thorold Gosset enumerated the list of nonprismatic semiregular convex polytopes with regular cells (Platonic solids) in his publication On the Regular and Semi-Regular Figures in Space of n Dimensions. In four dimensions, this gives the rectified 5-cell, the rectified 600-cell, and the snub 24-cell.
 1910: Alicia Boole Stott, in her publication Geometrical deduction of semiregular from regular polytopes and space fillings, expanded the definition by also allowing Archimedean solid and prism cells. This construction enumerated 45 semiregular 4-polytopes, corresponding to the nonprismatic forms listed below. The snub 24-cell and grand antiprism were missing from her list.
 1911: Pieter Hendrik Schoute published Analytic treatment of the polytopes regularly derived from the regular polytopes, followed Boole-Stott's notations, enumerating the convex uniform polytopes by symmetry based on 5-cell, 8-cell/16-cell, and 24-cell.
 1912: E. L. Elte independently expanded on Gosset's list with the publication The Semiregular Polytopes of the Hyperspaces, polytopes with one or two types of semiregular facets.
 Convex uniform polytopes:
1940: The search was expanded systematically by H.S.M. Coxeter in his publication Regular and Semi-Regular Polytopes.
 Convex uniform 4-polytopes:
1965: The complete list of convex forms was finally enumerated by John Horton Conway and Michael Guy, in their publication Four-Dimensional Archimedean Polytopes, established by computer analysis, adding only one non-Wythoffian convex 4-polytope, the grand antiprism.
 1966 Norman Johnson completes his Ph.D. dissertation The Theory of Uniform Polytopes and Honeycombs under advisor Coxeter, completes the basic theory of uniform polytopes for dimensions 4 and higher.
 1986 Coxeter published a paper Regular and Semi-Regular Polytopes II which included analysis of the unique snub 24-cell structure, and the symmetry of the anomalous grand antiprism.
 1998-2000: The 4-polytopes were systematically named by Norman Johnson, and given by George Olshevsky's online indexed enumeration (used as a basis for this listing). Johnson named the 4-polytopes as polychora, like polyhedra for 3-polytopes, from the Greek roots poly ("many") and choros ("room" or "space"). The names of the uniform polychora started with the 6 regular polychora with prefixes based on rings in the Coxeter diagrams; truncation t0,1, cantellation, t0,2, runcination t0,3, with single ringed forms called rectified, and bi,tri-prefixes added when the first ring was on the second or third nodes. 
 2004: A proof that the Conway-Guy set is complete was published by Marco Möller in his dissertation, Vierdimensionale Archimedische Polytope. Möller reproduced Johnson's naming system in his listing.
 2008: The Symmetries of Things was published by John H. Conway and contains the first print-published listing of the convex uniform 4-polytopes and higher dimensional polytopes by Coxeter group family, with general vertex figure diagrams for each ringed Coxeter diagram permutation—snub, grand antiprism, and duoprisms—which he called proprisms for product prisms. He used his own ijk-ambo naming scheme for the indexed ring permutations beyond truncation and bitruncation, and all of Johnson's names were included in the book index.
 Nonregular uniform star 4-polytopes: (similar to the nonconvex uniform polyhedra)
1966: Johnson describes three nonconvex uniform antiprisms in 4-space in his dissertation.
1990-2006: In a collaborative search, up to 2005 a total of 1845 uniform 4-polytopes (convex and nonconvex) had been identified by Jonathan Bowers and George Olshevsky, with an additional four discovered in 2006 for a total of 1849. The count includes the 74 prisms of the 75 non-prismatic uniform polyhedra (since that is a finite set – the cubic prism is excluded as it duplicates the tesseract), but not the infinite categories of duoprisms or prisms of antiprisms.
2020-2021: 340 new polychora were found, bringing up the total number of known uniform 4-polytopes to 2189. The list has not been proven complete.

Regular 4-polytopes 

Regular 4-polytopes are a subset of the uniform 4-polytopes, which satisfy additional requirements. Regular 4-polytopes can be expressed with Schläfli symbol {p,q,r} have cells of type {p,q}, faces of type {p}, edge figures {r}, and vertex figures {q,r}.

The existence of a regular 4-polytope {p,q,r} is constrained by the existence of the regular polyhedra {p,q} which becomes cells, and {q,r} which becomes the vertex figure.

Existence as a finite 4-polytope is dependent upon an inequality:

The 16 regular 4-polytopes, with the property that all cells, faces, edges, and vertices are congruent:
 6 regular convex 4-polytopes: 5-cell {3,3,3}, 8-cell {4,3,3}, 16-cell {3,3,4}, 24-cell {3,4,3}, 120-cell {5,3,3}, and 600-cell {3,3,5}.
 10 regular star 4-polytopes: icosahedral 120-cell {3,5,5/2}, small stellated 120-cell {5/2,5,3}, great 120-cell {5,5/2,5}, grand 120-cell {5,3,5/2}, great stellated 120-cell {5/2,3,5}, grand stellated 120-cell {5/2,5,5/2}, great grand 120-cell {5,5/2,3}, great icosahedral 120-cell {3,5/2,5}, grand 600-cell {3,3,5/2}, and great grand stellated 120-cell {5/2,3,3}.

Convex uniform 4-polytopes

Symmetry of uniform 4-polytopes in four dimensions 

There are 5 fundamental mirror symmetry point group families in 4-dimensions: A4 = , B4 = , D4 = , F4 = , H4 = . There are also 3 prismatic groups A3A1 = , B3A1 = , H3A1 = , and duoprismatic groups: I2(p)×I2(q) = . Each group defined by a Goursat tetrahedron fundamental domain bounded by mirror planes.

Each reflective uniform 4-polytope can be constructed in one or more reflective point group in 4 dimensions by a Wythoff construction, represented by rings around permutations of nodes in a Coxeter diagram. Mirror hyperplanes can be grouped, as seen by colored nodes, separated by even-branches. Symmetry groups of the form [a,b,a], have an extended symmetry, [[a,b,a]], doubling the symmetry order. This includes [3,3,3], [3,4,3], and [p,2,p]. Uniform polytopes in these group with symmetric rings contain this extended symmetry.

If all mirrors of a given color are unringed (inactive) in a given uniform polytope, it will have a lower symmetry construction by removing all of the inactive mirrors. If all the nodes of a given color are ringed (active), an alternation operation can generate a new 4-polytope with chiral symmetry, shown as "empty" circled nodes", but the geometry is not generally adjustable to create uniform solutions.

Enumeration 

There are 64 convex uniform 4-polytopes, including the 6 regular convex 4-polytopes, and excluding the infinite sets of the duoprisms and the antiprismatic prisms.
 5 are polyhedral prisms based on the Platonic solids (1 overlap with regular since a cubic hyperprism is a tesseract)
 13 are polyhedral prisms based on the Archimedean solids
 9 are in the self-dual regular A4 [3,3,3] group (5-cell) family.
 9 are in the self-dual regular F4 [3,4,3] group (24-cell) family. (Excluding snub 24-cell)
 15 are in the regular B4 [3,3,4] group (tesseract/16-cell) family (3 overlap with 24-cell family)
 15 are in the regular H4 [3,3,5] group (120-cell/600-cell) family.
 1 special snub form in the [3,4,3] group (24-cell) family.
 1 special non-Wythoffian 4-polytope, the grand antiprism.
 TOTAL: 68 − 4 = 64

These 64 uniform 4-polytopes are indexed below by George Olshevsky. Repeated symmetry forms are indexed in brackets.

In addition to the 64 above, there are 2 infinite prismatic sets that generate all of the remaining convex forms:
 Set of uniform antiprismatic prisms - sr{p,2}×{ } - Polyhedral prisms of two antiprisms.
 Set of uniform duoprisms - {p}×{q} - A Cartesian product of two polygons.

The A4 family 

The 5-cell has diploid pentachoric [3,3,3] symmetry, of order 120, isomorphic to the permutations of five elements, because all pairs of vertices are related in the same way.

Facets (cells) are given, grouped in their Coxeter diagram locations by removing specified nodes.

The three uniform 4-polytopes forms marked with an asterisk, *, have the higher extended pentachoric symmetry, of order 240,  because the element corresponding to any element of the underlying 5-cell can be exchanged with one of those corresponding to an element of its dual. There is one small index subgroup [3,3,3]+, order 60, or its doubling +, order 120, defining an omnisnub 5-cell which is listed for completeness, but is not uniform.

The B4 family

This family has diploid hexadecachoric symmetry, [4,3,3], of order 24×16=384: 4!=24 permutations of the four axes, 24=16 for reflection in each axis. There are 3 small index subgroups, with the first two generate uniform 4-polytopes which are also repeated in other families, [1+,4,3,3], [4,(3,3)+], and [4,3,3]+, all order 192.

Tesseract truncations

16-cell truncations 

(*) Just as rectifying the tetrahedron produces the octahedron, rectifying the 16-cell produces the 24-cell, the regular member of the following family.

The snub 24-cell is repeat to this family for completeness. It is an alternation of the cantitruncated 16-cell or truncated 24-cell, with the half symmetry group [(3,3)+,4]. The truncated octahedral cells become icosahedra. The cubes becomes tetrahedra, and 96 new tetrahedra are created in the gaps from the removed vertices.

The F4 family

This family has diploid icositetrachoric symmetry, [3,4,3], of order 24×48=1152: the 48 symmetries of the octahedron for each of the 24 cells. There are 3 small index subgroups, with the first two isomorphic pairs generating uniform 4-polytopes which are also repeated in other families, [3+,4,3], [3,4,3+], and [3,4,3]+, all order 576.

 (†) The snub 24-cell here, despite its common name, is not analogous to the snub cube; rather, it is derived by an alternation of the truncated 24-cell. Its symmetry number is only 576, (the ionic diminished icositetrachoric group, [3+,4,3]).

Like the 5-cell, the 24-cell is self-dual, and so the following three forms have twice as many symmetries, bringing their total to 2304 (extended icositetrachoric symmetry ).

The H4 family

This family has diploid hexacosichoric symmetry, [5,3,3], of order 120×120=24×600=14400: 120 for each of the 120 dodecahedra, or 24 for each of the 600 tetrahedra. There is one small index subgroups [5,3,3]+, all order 7200.

120-cell truncations

600-cell truncations

The D4 family 

This demitesseract family, [31,1,1], introduces no new uniform 4-polytopes, but it is worthy to repeat these alternative constructions. This family has order 12×16=192: 4!/2=12 permutations of the four axes, half as alternated, 24=16 for reflection in each axis. There is one small index subgroups that generating uniform 4-polytopes, [31,1,1]+, order 96.

When the 3 bifurcated branch nodes are identically ringed, the symmetry can be increased by 6, as [3[31,1,1]] = [3,4,3], and thus these polytopes are repeated from the 24-cell family.

Here again the snub 24-cell, with the symmetry group [31,1,1]+ this time, represents an alternated truncation of the truncated 24-cell creating 96 new tetrahedra at the position of the deleted vertices. In contrast to its appearance within former groups as partly snubbed 4-polytope, only within this symmetry group it has the full analogy to the Kepler snubs, i.e. the snub cube and the snub dodecahedron.

The grand antiprism
There is one non-Wythoffian uniform convex 4-polytope, known as the grand antiprism, consisting of 20 pentagonal antiprisms forming two perpendicular rings joined by 300 tetrahedra.  It is loosely analogous to the three-dimensional antiprisms, which consist of two parallel polygons joined by a band of triangles. Unlike them, however, the grand antiprism is not a member of an infinite family of uniform polytopes.

Its symmetry is the ionic diminished Coxeter group, [[10,2+,10]], order 400.

Prismatic uniform 4-polytopes

A prismatic polytope is a Cartesian product of two polytopes of lower dimension; familiar examples are the 3-dimensional prisms, which are products of a polygon and a line segment.  The prismatic uniform 4-polytopes consist of two infinite families:
 Polyhedral prisms: products of a line segment and a uniform polyhedron.  This family is infinite because it includes prisms built on 3-dimensional prisms and antiprisms.
 Duoprisms: products of two polygons.

Convex polyhedral prisms 
The most obvious family of prismatic 4-polytopes is the polyhedral prisms, i.e. products of a polyhedron with a line segment.  The cells of such a 4-polytopes are two identical uniform polyhedra lying in parallel hyperplanes (the base cells) and a layer of prisms joining them (the lateral cells).  This family includes prisms for the 75 nonprismatic uniform polyhedra (of which 18 are convex; one of these, the cube-prism, is listed above as the tesseract).

There are 18 convex polyhedral prisms created from 5 Platonic solids and 13 Archimedean solids as well as for the infinite families of three-dimensional prisms and antiprisms.  The symmetry number of a polyhedral prism is twice that of the base polyhedron.

Tetrahedral prisms: A3 × A1 

This prismatic tetrahedral symmetry is [3,3,2], order 48. There are two index 2 subgroups, [(3,3)+,2] and [3,3,2]+, but the second doesn't generate a uniform 4-polytope.

Octahedral prisms: B3 × A1 

This prismatic octahedral family symmetry is [4,3,2], order 96. There are 6 subgroups of index 2, order 48 that are expressed in alternated 4-polytopes below. Symmetries are [(4,3)+,2], [1+,4,3,2], [4,3,2+], [4,3+,2], [4,(3,2)+], and [4,3,2]+.

Icosahedral prisms: H3 × A1 

This prismatic icosahedral symmetry is [5,3,2], order 240. There are two index 2 subgroups, [(5,3)+,2] and [5,3,2]+, but the second doesn't generate a uniform polychoron.

Duoprisms: [p] × [q] 

The second is the infinite family of uniform duoprisms, products of two regular polygons. Its vertex figure is a disphenoid tetrahedron, .

This family overlaps with the first: when one of the two "factor" polygons is a square, the product is equivalent to a hyperprism whose base is a three-dimensional prism.  The symmetry number of a duoprism whose factors are a p-gon and a q-gon (a "p,q-duoprism") is 4pq if p≠q; if the factors are both p-gons, the symmetry number is 8p2. The tesseract can also be considered a 4,4-duoprism.

The elements of a p,q-duoprism (p ≥ 3, q ≥ 3) are:
 Cells: p q-gonal prisms, q p-gonal prisms
 Faces: pq squares, p q-gons, q p-gons
 Edges: 2pq
 Vertices: pq

There is no uniform analogue in four dimensions to the infinite family of three-dimensional antiprisms.

Infinite set of p-q duoprism -  - p q-gonal prisms, q p-gonal prisms:

Alternations are possible.  =  gives the family of duoantiprisms, but they generally cannot be made uniform. p=q=2 is the only convex case that can be made uniform, giving the regular 16-cell. p=5, q=5/3 is the only nonconvex case that can be made uniform, giving the so-called great duoantiprism.  gives the p-2q-gonal prismantiprismoid (an edge-alternation of the 2p-4q duoprism), but this cannot be made uniform in any cases.

Polygonal prismatic prisms: [p] × [ ] × [ ] 

The infinite set of uniform prismatic prisms overlaps with the 4-p duoprisms: (p≥3) -  - p cubes and 4 p-gonal prisms - (All are the same as 4-p duoprism) The second polytope in the series is a lower symmetry of the regular tesseract, {4}×{4}.

Polygonal antiprismatic prisms: [p] × [ ] × [ ] 

The infinite sets of uniform antiprismatic prisms are constructed from two parallel uniform antiprisms): (p≥2) -  - 2 p-gonal antiprisms, connected by 2 p-gonal prisms and 2p triangular prisms. 

A p-gonal antiprismatic prism has 4p triangle, 4p square and 4 p-gon faces. It has 10p edges, and 4p vertices.

Nonuniform alternations 

Coxeter showed only two uniform solutions for rank 4 Coxeter groups with all rings alternated (shown with empty circle nodes).

Such nonuniform alternated figures can be constructed as vertex-transitive 4-polytopes by the removal of one of two half sets of the vertices of the full ringed figure, but will have unequal edge lengths. Just like uniform alternations, they will have half of the symmetry of uniform figure, like [4,3,3]+, order 192, is the symmetry of the alternated omnitruncated tesseract.

Wythoff constructions with alternations produce vertex-transitive figures that can be made equilateral, but not uniform because the alternated gaps (around the removed vertices) create cells that are not regular or semiregular. A proposed name for such figures is scaliform polytopes. This category allows a subset of Johnson solids as cells, for example triangular cupola.

Each vertex configuration within a Johnson solid must exist within the vertex figure. For example, a square pyramid has two vertex configurations: 3.3.4 around the base, and 3.3.3.3 at the apex.

The nets and vertex figures of the four convex equilateral cases are given below, along with a list of cells around each vertex.

Geometric derivations for 46 nonprismatic Wythoffian uniform polychora  
The 46 Wythoffian 4-polytopes include the six convex regular 4-polytopes. The other forty can be derived from the regular polychora by geometric operations which preserve most or all of their symmetries, and therefore may be classified by the symmetry groups that they have in common.

The geometric operations that derive the 40 uniform 4-polytopes from the regular 4-polytopes are truncating operations. A 4-polytope may be truncated at the vertices, edges or faces, leading to addition of cells corresponding to those elements, as shown in the columns of the tables below.

The Coxeter-Dynkin diagram shows the four mirrors of the Wythoffian kaleidoscope as nodes, and the edges between the nodes are labeled by an integer showing the angle between the mirrors (π/n radians or 180/n degrees). Circled nodes show which mirrors are active for each form; a mirror is active with respect to a vertex that does not lie on it.

See also convex uniform honeycombs, some of which illustrate these operations as applied to the regular cubic honeycomb.

If two polytopes are duals of each other (such as the tesseract and 16-cell, or the 120-cell and 600-cell), then bitruncating, runcinating or omnitruncating either produces the same figure as the same operation to the other.  Thus where only the participle appears in the table it should be understood to apply to either parent.

Summary of constructions by extended symmetry 
The 46 uniform polychora constructed from the A4, B4, F4, H4 symmetry are given in this table by their full extended symmetry and Coxeter diagrams. The D4 symmetry is also included, though it only creates duplicates. Alternations are grouped by their chiral symmetry. All alternations are given, although the snub 24-cell, with its 3 constructions from different families is the only one that is uniform. Counts in parenthesis are either repeats or nonuniform. The Coxeter diagrams are given with subscript indices 1 through 46. The 3-3 and 4-4 duoprismatic family is included, the second for its relation to the B4 family.

Uniform star polychora 
Other than the aforementioned infinite duoprism and antiprism prism families, which have infinitely many nonconvex members, many uniform star polychora have been discovered. In 1852, Ludwig Schläfli discovered four regular star polychora: {5,3,5/2}, {5/2,3,5}, {3,3,5/2}, and {5/2,3,3}. In 1883, Edmund Hess found the other six: {3,5,5/2}, {5/2,5,3}, {5,5/2,5}, {5/2,5,5/2}, {5,5/2,3}, and {3,5/2,5}. Norman Johnson described three uniform antiprism-like star polychora in his doctoral dissertation of 1966: they are based on the three ditrigonal polyhedra sharing the edges and vertices of the regular dodecahedron. Many more have been found since then by other researchers, including Jonathan Bowers and George Olshevsky, creating a total count of 2125 known uniform star polychora at present (not counting the infinite set of duoprisms based on star polygons). There is currently no proof of the set's completeness.

See also
 Finite regular skew polyhedra of 4-space
 Convex uniform honeycomb - related infinite 4-polytopes in Euclidean 3-space.
 Convex uniform honeycombs in hyperbolic space - related infinite 4-polytopes in Hyperbolic 3-space.
 Paracompact uniform honeycombs

References

A. Boole Stott: Geometrical deduction of semiregular from regular polytopes and space fillings, Verhandelingen of the Koninklijke academy van Wetenschappen width unit Amsterdam, Eerste Sectie 11,1, Amsterdam, 1910
B. Grünbaum Convex Polytopes,  New York ; London : Springer, c2003. . Second edition prepared by Volker Kaibel, Victor Klee, and Günter M. Ziegler.
  
H.S.M. Coxeter: 
 H.S.M. Coxeter, M.S. Longuet-Higgins und J.C.P. Miller: Uniform Polyhedra, Philosophical Transactions of the Royal Society of London, Londen, 1954
H.S.M. Coxeter, Regular Polytopes, 3rd Edition, Dover New York, 1973
Kaleidoscopes: Selected Writings of H.S.M. Coxeter, editied by F. Arthur Sherk, Peter McMullen, Anthony C. Thompson, Asia Ivic Weiss, Wiley-Interscience Publication, 1995, 
 (Paper 22) H.S.M. Coxeter, Regular and Semi Regular Polytopes I, [Math. Zeit. 46 (1940) 380-407, MR 2,10]
 (Paper 23) H.S.M. Coxeter, Regular and Semi-Regular Polytopes II, [Math. Zeit. 188 (1985) 559-591]
 (Paper 24) H.S.M. Coxeter, Regular and Semi-Regular Polytopes III, [Math. Zeit. 200 (1988) 3-45]
 H.S.M. Coxeter and W. O. J. Moser. Generators and Relations for Discrete Groups 4th ed, Springer-Verlag. New York. 1980 p. 92, p. 122.
John H. Conway, Heidi Burgiel, Chaim Goodman-Strauss, The Symmetries of Things 2008,  (Chapter 26)
John H. Conway and M.J.T. Guy: Four-Dimensional Archimedean Polytopes, Proceedings of the Colloquium on Convexity at Copenhagen, page 38 und 39, 1965
N.W. Johnson: The Theory of Uniform Polytopes and Honeycombs, Ph.D. Dissertation, University of Toronto, 1966
 N.W. Johnson: Geometries and Transformations, (2015) Chapter 11: Finite symmetry groups
 Richard Klitzing, Snubs, alternated facetings, and Stott-Coxeter-Dynkin diagrams, Symmetry: Culture and Science, Vol. 21, No.4, 329-344, (2010) 
 Googlebook, 370-381

External links

 Convex uniform 4-polytopes
Uniform, convex polytopes in four dimensions, Marco Möller . Includes alternative names for these figures, including those from Jonathan Bowers, George Olshevsky, and Norman Johnson.
Regular and semi-regular convex polytopes a short historical overview
Java3D Applets with sources
 Nonconvex uniform 4-polytopes
Uniform polychora by Jonathan Bowers
 Stella4D Stella (software) produces interactive views of known uniform polychora including the 64 convex forms and the infinite prismatic families. 
 
 4D-Polytopes and Their Dual Polytopes of the Coxeter Group W(A4) Represented by Quaternions International Journal of Geometric Methods in Modern Physics,Vol. 9, No. 4 (2012) Mehmet Koca, Nazife Ozdes Koca, Mudhahir Al-Ajmi (2012) 

4-polytopes